Santiago González and Wesley Koolhof were the defending champions but chose not to defend their title.

Simone Bolelli and Guillermo Durán won the title after defeating Nathaniel Lammons and Antonio Šančić 6–3, 6–2 in the final.

Seeds

Draw

References

External links
 Main draw

Sparkassen Open - Doubles
2019 Doubles